This list of accidents and incidents on airliners in the India summarizes airline accidents that occurred within the territories claimed by India, with information on airline company with flight number, date, and cause.

This list is a subset of the list of accidents and incidents involving airliners by location. It is also available grouped
 by year as List of accidents and incidents involving commercial aircraft;
 by airline;
 by category.

References

 
Airliners by location
Accidents and incidents
Articles containing video clips